Tomás Moschión (born 2 June 2000) is an Argentine professional footballer who plays as a midfielder for Colón.

Career

Club
Moschión started his career with Colón, signing in 2009 from Arocena, with the midfielder moving into the club's senior squad under Eduardo Domínguez in 2018. He made his professional debut on 4 November, coming on as a substitute for Franco Zuculini during a 1–1 draw with Rosario Central in the Argentine Primera División.

International
In June 2015, Moschión was selected to train with the Argentina U15s.

Career statistics
.

References

External links

2000 births
Living people
People from San Jerónimo Department
Argentine people of French descent
Argentine footballers
Association football midfielders
Argentine Primera División players
Club Atlético Colón footballers
Sportspeople from Santa Fe Province